Blackstone and Franklin Squares are public parks located in the South End neighborhood of Boston, Massachusetts.

Description

The two squares are separated by Washington Street and bounded on the north by Brookline Street, to the east by St George Street, to the south by Newton Street, and to the west by Shawmut Avenue.  An iron fence surrounds the perimeter of each square, with entrances at each of the corners.  There is also an entrance to Blackstone Square at the intersection of Pembroke Street and Shawmut Avenue and a fifth entrance to Franklin Square along Newton Street.

Blackstone Square encompasses  and Franklin Square spans .  Both are maintained under Land and Water Conservation Fund of the National Park Service

The squares operate under Article 97 of the Massachusetts State Constitution, which states:

Blackstone and Franklin Square can be reached by the MBTA Silver Line routes SL4 and SL5, and bus routes #8 and #10.

History

Charles Bulfinch, who created the plan for the South End, originally intended the two squares to be one, calling it Columbia Square.  Franklin Square opened in 1849 and Blackstone Square subsequently opened in 1855.

The St. James Hotel, now the Franklin Square House Apartments, served as the exterior backdrop of the popular 1980's NBC hospital drama series, St. Elsewhere.

In 1979, after years of neglect, local resident Brian Davidson began an effort to clean up the squares.  He personally picked up trash and after several years the city of Boston began a revitalization project that included new fences, fountains, benches, and trees.

Features

Foliage
A variety of trees are planted in and around the parks.  Surrounding the exterior perimeter of the park are Sugar Maple (Acer saccharum).  Inside the park and lining the walkways are Silver Linden (Tilia tomentosa).  There is a large White Oak (Quercus alba) in Franklin Square as well.

Fountains
There are two identical fountains, one in each square, located centrally at the intersection of the walkways.  At the base of each fountain are four stylized fish surrounding an ornate pedestal that holds a large bowl in the shape of a seashell.

References

Squares in Boston
South End, Boston